Graciela María Luisa Romero Piñero (14 May 1925 – 4 November 2011), better known by her nickname Totó Romero, was a Chilean social worker, journalist, and writer. She was a recipient of the Lenka Franulic Award.

Biography
The daughter of writer  and the Argentine Zulema Piñero, Graciela Romero was educated at the Colegio Universitario Inglés of Santiago. She was the niece of distinguished journalist María Romero.

At age 21, she married the Spanish citizen Andrés Rosselló, who was 16 years her senior. They separated because he wanted her to stop working, for which she took the car and the driver. "If you want to work, take a micro," he told her. She did not go in a microbus, but in a taxi. The couple had one child, Alfonso Roselló.

Despite being a social worker by profession, she was known nationally for her joint writing with journalist Ximena Torres Cautivo. She worked in various media, most memorably for the magazine . She also covered news of the international jet set for Vanidades.

Romero was an outspoken liberal and feminist, and at one point lost her job at Salvador Hospital for advocating the use of oral contraceptives.

Her health began to decline in 2009 after being treated for lung cancer, and she was required to use an oxygen tank. She died on 4 November 2011.

Publications
 El evento 
 El chileno de maleta 
 Cómo sobrevivir en Chile después de los 30
 Con el voto a dos manos

References

1925 births
2011 deaths
20th-century Chilean women writers
20th-century Chilean non-fiction writers
21st-century Chilean women writers
21st-century Chilean non-fiction writers
Chilean feminists
Chilean journalists
Chilean women journalists
Social workers
Chilean non-fiction writers